Leopoldamys is a genus of rodents in the family Muridae endemic to Southeast Asia. It contains the following species:
 Sundaic mountain long-tailed giant rat (Leopoldamys ciliatus)
 Diwangkara's long-tailed giant rat (Leopoldamys diwangkarai)
 Edwards's long-tailed giant rat (Leopoldamys edwardsi)
 Millet's long-tailed giant rat (Leopoldamys milleti)
 Neill's long-tailed giant rat (Leopoldamys neilli)
 Long-tailed giant rat (Leopoldamys sabanus)
 Mentawai long-tailed giant rat (Leopoldamys siporanus)

References

 
Rodent genera
Taxonomy articles created by Polbot